Shafique Ahmed Siddique is a Bangladeshi academic and professor of Dhaka University. He is the chairperson of the governing body of Dhaka Commerce College. He is the chairperson of Bangladesh University of Business and Technology and vice-chairperson of Association of Private Universities of Bangladesh.

Early life 

Siddique was born on 27 August 1950. His father was Abu Siddique and mother was Shamsun Nahar Siddique. His brothers are Tarique Ahmed Siddique, defence advisor to Prime Minister Sheikh Hasina, and Rafique Ahmed Siddique, chairperson of Bangladesh Steel and Engineering Corporation. He completed his undergraduate and master's from the University of Dhaka.

Career 
Siddique joined the University of Dhaka in 1974 and subsequently completed a second master's in finance from Southampton University. He was promoted to assistant professor in 1986 and completed his Phd from Brunel University. From 1988 to 1992, he taught at the Brunel University as an assistant professor. He was promoted to associate professor in 1993.

In 2004, Siddique filed a defamation suit against Motiur Rahman Rentu over his book, Amar Fashi Chai. In April 2007, a Dhaka court issued a verdict in favor of Siddique and awarded him 10 million taka in damages. After failing to get the compensation, Siddique filed a case seeking the confiscation of Rentu's properties on 10 August 2007.

Siddique is the founder chairperson of Bangladesh University of Business and Technology. He is the former chairperson of the governing body of Dhaka Commerce College and the founding secretary of Bangabandhu Memorial Trust. He had previously served as the chairperson of Dhaka University's Bureau of Business Research. He is the vice-chairperson of Association of Private Universities of Bangladesh.

Personal life 
Siddique is married to Sheikh Rehana in 1977 in London, sister of current Prime Minister Sheikh Hasina. Sheikh Hasina, who was at the time exiled in New Delhi, could not attend the wedding due to lack of travel fund. The couple blessed with a son, Radwan Mujib Siddiq, was born on 21 May 1980 and two daughters, Tulip Rizwana Siddiq, member of British parliament, and Azmina Siddiq, consultant at Control Risks in London.

On 18 February 2016, Siddique described a string of 35 cases against Mafuz Anam, editor of The Daily Star, as "too much" while on BanglaVision.

References 

1950 births
Living people
Awami League politicians
Sheikh Mujibur Rahman family
Academic staff of the University of Dhaka